The OEC Kaohsiung is a tennis tournament held in Kaohsiung, Taiwan since 2012. The event is part of the ATP Challenger Tour and is played on indoor carpet courts.

Past finals

Singles

Doubles

References

External links
Official Website

ATP Challenger Tour
Tennis tournaments in Taiwan
Hard court tennis tournaments